The catholic epistles (also called the general epistles) are seven epistles of the New Testament. Listed in order of their appearance in the New Testament, the catholic epistles are:

Naming 
The word catholic in the term catholic epistles has been a convention dating from the 4th century. At the time, that word simply meant "general", and was not specifically tied to any denomination, for example, what would later become known as the Catholic Church. Nevertheless, to avoid the impression these letters are only recognised in Catholicism, alternative terms such as "general epistles" or "general missionary epistles" are used. In the historical context, the word catholic probably signified that the letters were addressed to the general church, and not to specific, separate congregations or persons, as with the Pauline epistles. However, 2 John and 3 John appear to contradict this view, because their addresses are respectively to the "elect lady", speculated by many to be the church itself, and to "Gaius", about whom there has been much speculation but little in the way of conclusive proof as to his identity. Some historians therefore think that the label catholic was originally applied to just 1 John, and expanded to all other non-Pauline epistles later on.

Some Protestants have termed these "Lesser Epistles".

Authorship 
Three of the seven letters are anonymous. These three have traditionally been attributed to John the Apostle, the son of Zebedee and one of the Twelve Apostles of Jesus. Consequently, these letters have been labelled the Johannine epistles, despite the fact that none of the epistles mentions any author.  Most modern scholars believe the author is not John the Apostle, but there is no scholarly consensus for any particular historical figure.  (See Authorship of the Johannine works.)

Two of the letters claim to have been written by Simon Peter, one of the Twelve Apostles of Jesus. Therefore, they have traditionally been called the Petrine epistles. However, most modern scholars agree the second epistle was probably not written by Peter, because it appears to have been written in the early 2nd century, long after Peter had died. Yet, opinions on the first epistle are more divided; many scholars do think this letter is authentic, although it is written in a polished Greek even better than that of Paul, which is unlikely for an illiterate Jewish fisherman, and adopts Paul's theology, which fits poorly with the tension between Paul and Peter.

In one epistle, the author only calls himself James (Ἰάκωβος Iákobos). It is not known which James this is supposed to be. There are several different traditional Christian interpretations of other New Testament texts which mention a James, brother of Jesus. However, most modern scholars tend to reject this line of reasoning, since the author himself does not indicate any familial relationship with Jesus. A similar problem presents itself with the Epistle of Jude (Ἰούδας Ioudas): the writer names himself a brother of James (ἀδελφὸς  δὲ  Ἰακώβου adelphos de Iakóbou), but it is not clear which James is meant. According to some Christian traditions, this is the same James as the author of the Epistle of James, himself reputedly a brother of Jesus; and so, this Jude should also be a brother of Jesus, despite the fact he does not indicate any such thing in his text.

With the exception of the Petrine epistles, both of which may be pseudepigrapha, the seven catholic epistles were added to the New Testament canon because early church fathers attributed the anonymous epistles to important people, and attributed the epistles written by people with the same name as important people to those important people.

References

External links
 Oxford University Press - Bibliographies
 Bible Hub Catholic Epistles
 Coptic Orthodox Church - Dictionary
 Catholic Encyclopedia: Catholic Epistles
 Ancient Faith Ministries - Introduction to the Catholic Epistles
 Notes on the General Epistles by C. I. Scofield

 
Canonical epistles
Christian terminology